The Superclásico de Quito is a football rivalry between Ecuadorian clubs Aucas and LDU Quito, both from the capital city of Quito.

Origins
The origins of the Superclásico de Quito began with a relegation/promotion playoff in 1945. In that year's Pichincha tournament, Liga de Quito finished last in the top division, while Aucas finished first in the second division. Another team, Deportivo Ecuador, took part in the playoff, but withdrew after being defeated by Aucas. The first match between Liga and Aucas occurred on February 11, 1945, which ended in a 1–1 tie. A second match, played on February 18, ended in a 2–2 draw. At the end of the 90 minutes, the game was 2–1; the timekeeper ended the match, but the referee did not notice, allowing the game to continue into extra time, where Aucas equalized the score. The public grew livid at the referee's bad call and did not allow extra time to be played. Since the game ended in a draw, the Pichicha football association decided to allow both teams into the first division.

Devaluation

Record wins
Aucas: 7–0 (March 23, 1947)
LDU Quito: 8–0 (April 9, 1989)

Latest match

References

External links

S.D. Aucas
L.D.U. Quito
Football rivalries in Ecuador
1945 establishments in Ecuador